Vitrea nadejdae is a species of small, air-breathing land snail, a terrestrial pulmonate gastropod mollusk in the family Pristilomatidae.

Distribution 
This species is endemic to the Crimea (Ukraine).

References

Pristilomatidae
Gastropods described in 1926